Welch Apartments is an historic building located in downtown Muscatine, Iowa, United States. The Scott House hotel existed on this property prior to this building, which was constructed about 1900. The Italianate-style building contain 26 units with different floor plans. The main floor contains commercial space. The four-story structure measures . The dominant feature of the exterior is the bay windows that protrude from the wall surface. The pressed-metal cornice unifies the building's composition.  High parapet gables are located above the cornice. They are executed in the Flemish Renaissance style. The building has been listed on the National Register of Historic Places since 1979. It became a contributing property in the Downtown Commercial Historic District in 2006.

References

Residential buildings completed in 1900
Italianate architecture in Iowa
Buildings and structures in Muscatine, Iowa
National Register of Historic Places in Muscatine County, Iowa
Apartment buildings on the National Register of Historic Places in Iowa
Individually listed contributing properties to historic districts on the National Register in Iowa